Balzhinima Tsyrenzhapovich Tsyrempilov (Balzhinimá Tsyrenzhápovich Tsyrempílov, born April 9, 1975 in Ulekchin, Zakamensky District, Buryatia) is a World Cup-winning and former world number one Buryat archer from Russia.

2004 Summer Olympics
Tsyrempilov competed at the 2004 Summer Olympics in men's individual archery.  Tsyrempilov placed 14th overall.

2007 World Championship
At the 2007 World Archery Championships in July 2007 in Leipzig, Tsyrempilov won silver in recurve men's individual.

2008 Summer Olympics
At the Men's individual archery event of 2008 Summer Olympics in Beijing Tsyrempilov finished his ranking round with a total of 671 points, eight points behind Juan René Serrano, the winner of the round. This gave him the sixth seed for the final competition bracket in which he faced Daniel Pavlov in the first round, beating the Bulgarian 112-102. In the second round Tsyrempilov had a rematch with Chen Szu-Yuan and took revenge for the loss in 2004 with a 109-101 win. However, in the third round Tsyrempilov's tournament was over after he was unable to beat Ryuichi Moriya, 113-110.

Together with Andrey Abramov and Bair Badënov he also took part in the team event. With his 671 score from the ranking round combined with the 660 of Abramov and the 658 of Badënov Russia was in fourth position after the ranking round, which gave them a straight seed into the quarter finals. However, with 217-209 they were beaten by the team from China that eventually won the bronze medal.

Individual performance timeline

References

External links
 
 

People from Buryatia
Buryat sportspeople
1975 births
Living people
Russian male archers
Olympic archers of Russia
Archers at the 1996 Summer Olympics
Archers at the 2000 Summer Olympics
Archers at the 2004 Summer Olympics
Archers at the 2008 Summer Olympics
World Archery Championships medalists
Sportspeople from Buryatia
21st-century Russian people